Pakistani English (also known as Paklish or Pinglish) is the group of English language varieties spoken and written in Pakistan. It was first so recognised and designated in the 1970s and 1980s. Pakistani English (PE), similar and related to British English, is slightly different from other dialects of English in respect to vocabulary, syntax, accent, spellings of some words and other features.

While English is not a common native language in Pakistan, it is used widely in education, commerce, and the legal and judicial systems.

History
Although British rule in the Subcontinent lasted for almost two hundred years, the areas which lie in what is now Pakistan were amongst the last to be annexed: Sindh in 1842, Punjab (which initially included the North-West Frontier Province) in 1849, and parts of Baluchistan, including Quetta and the outer regions in 1879, while the rest of the Baluchistan region became a princely state within the British Empire. As a result, British English had less time to become part of local culture though it did become part of elite culture as it was used in elite schools and in higher education, as in the rest of Subcontinent. The colonial policies which made English a marker of elite status and the language of power—being used in such domains of power as the civil service, the officer corps of the armed forces, the higher judiciary, universities, prestigious newspapers, radio and entertainment—was due to British policies and the continuation of these policies by Pakistani Governments. The roots of Pinglish in Pakistan can be traced back to the 19th century, when Sir Syed Ahmad Khan encouraged the Muslims to learn English and utilize it as a medium of resistance against the British. In 1947 upon Pakistan's establishment, English became the de facto official language, a position which was formalised in the Constitution of Pakistan of 1973. Together with Urdu, the two languages are concurrently the official languages of the country. English language continues as the language of power and is also the language with the maximum cultural capital of any language used in Pakistan. It remains much in demand in higher education in Pakistan.

The term Pinglish was first recorded in 1999, being a blend of the words Pakistani and English, with the 'e' changed to 'i' to better represent pronunciation. Another colloquial portmanteau word is Paklish (recorded from 1997).

Relationship with Indian English

Pakistani English (PE) shares many similarities with Indian English, but since the Partition of India, there have been some very obvious differences. Rahman argues that PE is an interference variety of English created by the use of the features of Urdu, Punjabi, Pashto, Sindhi and other languages spoken in Pakistan. He further divides PE into Anglicised English, which is very similar to the speech and writing of the speakers of British Standard English (BSE), acrolect PE, which is used by Pakistanis educated in English-medium schools, mesolectal PE, which is used by ordinary, Urdu-educated Pakistanis and basilect PE, which is used by people of little formal education, such as guides and waiters.

Words and expressions of PE have been noted by a number of scholars, including unique idioms and colloquial expressions as well as accents. It has been claimed in the early years of the millennium that foreign companies find accent neutralisation easier in Pakistan than in India, however no follow up studies have been carried out. Also, like Indian English, Pakistani English has preserved many phrases that are now considered antiquated in Britain.

Use in Pakistan
Urdu and English are Pakistan's official languages. All government documents, many street signs, many shop signs, business contracts and other activities use English. The language of the courts is also English.

English is taught to all school-level Pakistani students, and in many cases the medium of instruction is also in English. Although there are also many schools that teach in the local languages, there is a huge emphasis on English as a second language especially in standardised testing. At college and university level, all instructions are typically in English.

Pakistan boasts a large English language press and (more recently) media. All of Pakistan's major dailies are published in or have an edition in English. State-run PTV World is a major English Language News Channel in the country, while previously Dawn News and Tribune 24/7 were other English Language news channels with one later switching its language to Urdu and the other was shut down. Indus News is now another major English Language News Channel in Pakistan. Code-switching (the concurrent use of more than one language, or language variety, in conversation) is common in Pakistan and almost all conversations in whatever language have a significant English component. The language of pleading in all courts of Pakistan is also English.

Literature

Grammar
The role of English within the complex multilingual society of Pakistan is far from straightforward: it is used across the country by speakers with various degrees of proficiency; the grammar and phraseology may mimic that of the speaker's first language. While Pakistani speakers of English use idioms peculiar to their homeland (often literal translations of words and phrases from their native languages), this is far less common in proficient speakers, and grammar tends to be quite close to that of Standard English but exhibiting some features of American English.

Phonology
Pakistani English phonology follows that of British English. It may be rhotic or non-rhotic. Rahman provides a broad introduction to the phonology of Pakistani English.

Some common features of PE are:

Consonants
 The quality of  sound in PE is usually .
 Most, if not all, PE speakers do not aspirate their voiceless plosives .
 PE does not have  (velarised L)
 PE speakers use  before vowels in some words where standard Englishes (GenAmE and SSBE) would use , for example, "singer" is pronounced  

Vowels and diphthongs
  in PE is realised as 
  is realised as 
 The vowel in THOUGHT group (J. C. Wells Lexical sets) is realised by virtually all PE speakers as

Influences
Pakistani English is heavily influenced by Pakistan's languages as well as the English of other nations. Many words or terms from Urdu, such as 'cummerbund', have entered the global language and are also found in Pakistan. In addition the area which is now Pakistan was home to the largest garrisons of the British Indian Army (such as Rawalpindi and Peshawar) and this, combined with the post-partition influence of the Pakistan Military, has ensured that many military terms have entered the local jargon.

The type of English taught (and preferred) is British English. The heavy influence and penetration of American culture through television, films and other media has brought in great influences of American English.

Vocabulary and colloquialisms

Pakistani English contains many unique terms, as well as terms which are utilised somewhat differently in Pakistan. For instance, "" is used for potato chips as well as for French fries (usage of these terms is common in the UK) and "" is used for both lime and lemon.
 "" – Respectful way of addressing anyone who is significantly older than oneself: "Uncle, please give way".
 Use of double and triple for numbers occurring twice or three times in succession (this is also in usage in the UK), especially for a phone number: for example, a phone number 2233344 would be pronounced as "double two, triple three, double four"; however the phone number 2222555 would be pronounced as ”double two, double two, triple five”.
 Shopper means a shopping bag, rather than a person who is shopping, the latter is referred to as a customer.
 Petrol pump — This term used to refer to a petrol station (gas station).
 Opening/closing an object refers to turning something on or off; this is due to the verbs for to open and to close being the same as the verbs for to turn on and to turn off in Urdu and other Pakistani languages.
 "Alphabet" - can be used to refer to a single letter and "alphabets" can refer to a group of two or more letters.
 The use of "much" to emphasize the extent/magnitude of something. e.g. very much true instead of that's very true and too much difficult instead of very difficult.
 Light gone – This refers to the electric power outage from the electric supply company.
 Number – Often used in place of "marks" in an exam (used as both singular and plural without s while speaking in mixed English-Urdu).
 His/her meter has turned or -is high means that the person has lost his/her temper.  Usually used for a sudden outburst, one which is construed as unreasonable.
 Got no lift – received no attention or assistance from someone.
 In-Charge – a casual as well as formal title given to unit, group or division heads.
 Same to same – an expression to indicate something is exactly the same as some other thing.
 On parade – being at work or at a set activity.  Usually (though not always) in the context of starting something for the first time.  For example, I have been hired by the company, on parade from next Monday.
 Become a direct Sergeant – be promoted out of turn/ given responsibility and authority very early. Often in the context that a person is out of his/her depth. For example, no wonder that team has failed so badly, leader was a direct Sergeant.  Usually "Sergeant" is replaced by "Havildar" the equivalent rank in the Pakistan Army.  Also used for upwardly mobile, ambitious or nouveau riche.
 Miss is used to address or refer to female teachers, whatever their marital status, e.g. Yes, I have done my homework, Miss. Less commonly used to refer to women colleagues or subordinates. (Usage is also common in the UK)
 Madam is used to address and refer to females in positions of authority, usually a superior, e.g. Madam has ordered me to get the figures for last year's sales. Can also be used as a noun, e.g. She is the madam of that department meaning she is the head of the department, without it being derogatory.
 Sir is used for a male superior, often combined with their name or used as a noun. E.g. Is Sir in? or Sir Raza wants to see you in his office as soon as possible.
 Well left – avoided artfully, often a tricky situation; from cricket, the term "well left" is applied when a batsman chose not to play a potentially dangerous delivery, e.g. I well left that offer, it could have caused many problems.
 Threw/Received a googly – an unexpected situation arose, a person was surprised, often unpleasantly, e.g. had just settled down and then got the googly about the transfer. From googly, a delivery in cricket.
 Yorker – a sudden, dangerous and potentially devastating situation; similar use to googly, but usually has a certain amount of danger attached to it. My mother's heart attack while we were hiking in the mountains hit like a yorker, we were far from any medical help. Also used in a similar manner; bouncer. All three terms are derived from actual cricket deliveries, cricket being a popular sport in the country.
 Hit middle stump – did an action in such a manner that there is little room for further action, or a decisive blow, e.g. Really hit middle stump last year on that contract. Also derived from cricket.
 Master Sahib, contracted to Ma'Sahib – used to refer to a master craftsman.  The term is now used more frequently to refer to tailors and carpenters.
 Drinking a cigarette/cigar – smoking a cigarette.  This is due to the verbs for smoking being the same as the verbs for drinking in Urdu and other Pakistani languages.
 Elder – used as a comparative adjective in the sense of older.  For example, "I am elder to you", instead of "I am older than you."
 Even – as well/also/too: "Even I didn't know how to do it." This usage of even is borrowed from native grammatical structure.
 Graduation – completion of a bachelor's degree (as in the UK): "I did my graduation at Presidency College" ("I earned my bachelor's degree at Presidency College"), whereas in the United States it refers to completion of Highschool, Master's or PhD as well.
 Paining – hurting would be correct in Standard American and British: "My head is paining."
 Shirtings and suitings – the process of making such garments; a suffix in names of shops specialising in men's formal/business wear.
 Timings – hours of operation; scheduled time, such as office timings or train timings, as opposed to the standard usage such as "The timing of his ball delivery is very good."
 Gentry – generalised term for social class – not specifically 'high social class'.  The use of 'good', 'bad', 'high' and 'low' prefixed to 'gentry' is common.
 mutton – goat meat instead of sheep meat.

Words unique to (i.e. not generally well known outside South Asia) and/or popular in Pakistan include those in the following by no means exhaustive list:
 batchmate or batch-mate (not classmate, but a schoolmate of the same grade)
 compass box for a box holding mathematical instruments like compasses, divider, scale, protractor etc.; also widely referred to as a "geometry box"
 cousin-brother (male first cousin) and cousin-sister (female first cousin)
 overhead bridge (bridge meant for pedestrians)
 flyover (overpass or an over-bridge over a section of road or train tracks)
 godown (warehouse)
 godman somewhat pejorative word for a person who claims to be divine or who claims to have supernatural powers
 gully to mean a narrow lane or alley (from the Hindi word "gali" meaning the same).
 long-cut (the opposite of "short-cut", in other words, taking the longest route).
 mugging/cramming or mugging up (memorising, usually referring to learning "by rote," as used in British English and having nothing to do with street crime, that the expression might also mean in British/American English).
 nose-screw (woman's nose-ring)
 prepone (The "opposite" of postpone, that is to change a meeting to be earlier). Many dictionaries have added this word.
 tiffin box for lunch box. The word is also commonly used to mean a between-meal snack.
 BHK is real-estate terminology for "Bedroom, Hall and Kitchen", used almost exclusively in housing size categorisation. "Hall" refers to the living room, which is highlighted separately from other rooms. For instance, a 2BHK apartment has a total of three rooms – two bedrooms and a living room.
 co-brother indicates relationship between two men who are married to sisters, as in "He is my co-brother"
 co-inlaws indicates relationship between two sets of parents whose son and daughter are married, as in "Our co-inlaws live in Karachi."
 co-sister indicates relationship between two women who are married to brothers, as in "She is my co-sister"
 boss is a term used to refer to a male stranger such as shopkeeper: "Boss, what is the cost of that pen?"
 vote-bank is a term commonly used during the elections in Pakistan, implying a particular bloc or community of people inclined to cast their votes for a political party that promises to deliver policies favouring them.
 pant – Trousers
 Mess – A dining hall, especially used by students at a dormitory. "Mess" is also used in reference to eateries catering primarily to a working class population. Originated from the military term of similar meaning.
 Eve teasing – Verbal sexual harassment of women.
 "Where are you put up?" means 'Where are you currently staying?".
 "Out of station": "out of town". This phrase has its origins in the posting of army officers to particular "stations" during the days of the East India Company.
 ing pricey":"acting pricey": playing "hard to get", being snobbish.
 "pass out" is meant to graduate, as in "I passed out of the university in 1995". In American/British English, this usage is limited to graduating out of military academies.
 "tight slap" to mean "hard slap".
 Time-pass – Doing something for leisure but with no intention or target/satisfaction, procrastination, pastime.
 Time-waste  – Something that is a waste of time; procrastination. Presumably not even useful for leisure.
 Pindrop silence – Extreme silence (quiet enough to hear a pin drop).
 chargesheet: n. formal charges filed in a court; v. to file charges against someone in court
 redressal: n. redress, remedy, reparation
 "Hill Station" – mountain resort.
 "stepney" refers to a spare tyre. The word is a genericised trademark originating from the Stepney Spare Motor Wheel, itself named after Stepney Street, in Llanelli, Wales.
 Cooling glasses – sunglasses
 "cent per cent", "cent percent" – "100 percent/100 per cent" as in "He got cent per cent in math/maths".
 "loose motion" – diarrhoea
 "expire" – To die, especially in reference to one's family member.
 "bunking" – To skip class without permission, compare UK bunking off "carrying" – to be pregnant, as in "She is carrying".
 "pressurise" – to put pressure on someone, to influence.
 "club" or "clubbing" – To merge or put two things together. "Just club it together.”
 "cantonment" – permanent military installation.
 "taking an exam/test" as opposed to "taking/writing an exam", a phrase more commonly used in the US and Canada. ("giving a test" is used to refer to a person who is going to conduct the test)
 "register" as opposed to "notebook," a phrase more commonly used in the US.
 "copy" is used for notebook.
 "lady finger" is used for okra.

Words which are considered archaic in some varieties of English, but are still in use in Pakistani English:
 Curd – yogurt Dicky/Dickey/Digy – the trunk of a car (also obs "dicky seat" UK).
 In tension – being concerned or nervous.  Phrased another way, "He is taking too much tension".  Found in eighteenth-century British English.
 Into – multiplied by, as in 2 into 2 equals 4, rather than 2 times 2 is 4, which is more common in other varieties of English. The use of into dates back to the fifteenth century, when it had been common in British English.
 ragging – also used in public schools in the UK, hazing (US).
 Use of thrice, meaning "three times", is common in Pakistani English.
 Use of the phrases like nothing or like anything to express intensity. For example, "These people will cheat you like anything". Such usage was part of colloquial English language in seventeenth century Britain and America.http://dictionary.reference.com/search?q=like%20anything Reference.com. Retrieved 1 July 2009
 Word pairs "up to" and "in spite" compounded to "upto" and "inspite" respectively.
 Over – to speak frankly. "Don't be too over with me."
 Weeping – crying.

Numbering system
The Pakistani numbering system is preferred for digit grouping. When written in words, or when spoken, numbers less than 100,000 are expressed just as they are in Standard English. Numbers including and beyond 100,000 are expressed in a subset of the Pakistani numbering system. Thus, the following scale is used:

Larger numbers are generally expressed as multiples of the above."Back Corporate chiefs getting crores in salaries: 100 and counting!", SmartInvestor.in

Medical terms
Often the cause of undesirable confusion.
 Viral Fever: InfluenzaFlu: Common Cold
 Sugar: Diabetes
 Jaundice: Acute Hepatitis. While standard medical terminology uses jaundice for a symptom (yellow discolouration of skin), in Pakistan the term is used to refer to the illness in which this symptom is most common.
 Allopathy, used by homoeopaths to refer to conventional medicine.

Food
 Brinjal: aubergines / eggplant
 Capsicum: called chili pepper, red or green pepper, or sweet pepper in the UK and US; capsicum in Australia, New Zealand, Pakistan, Sri Lanka and India; bell pepper in the US, Canada, and the Bahamas; and paprika in the US and some other countries.
 Curds: Yogurt
 Sooji: Semolina
 Pulses, dal: pulses, e.g. lentils
 Karahi, kadai: wok
 Sago: tapioca, Yuca in US
 Ladyfinger, bhindi: okra
 Sabzi: greens, green vegetables

See also
 Urdish
 Bangladeshi English
 Sri Lankan English
 Indian English

References

Further reading
 Hashmi, A. (1989). "Prolegomena to the Study of Pakistani English and Pakistani Literature in English". Pakistani Literature (Islamabad), 2:1 1993.
 
 
 
 Mahboob, A. (2009). English as an Islamic Language: a case study of Pakistani English. World Englishes, 28(2):175–189. Link to abstract
 Mahboob, A. (2008). Pakistani English: morphology and syntax. In R. Mesthrie, B. Kortmann, & E. Schneider (Eds), A Handbook of Varieties of English: Africa, South and Southeast Asia (Vol. 4). Berlin: Mouton de Gruyter. Link to abstract
 Mahboob, A. & Ahmar, N. (2008). Pakistani English: phonology. In R. Mesthrie, B. Kortmann, & E. Schneider (Eds), A Handbook of Varieties of English: Africa, South and Southeast Asia (Vol. 4). Berlin: Mouton de Gruyter. Link to abstract
 Hartford, B. & Mahboob, A. (2004). Models of discourse in the letter of complaint. World Englishes'', 23(4): 585 – 600. Link to abstract

External links
 The Urdu-English Relationship and Its Impact on Pakistan's Social Development Claims "the current portion of the population that is functional in verbal and written English is less than two percent."

 
Languages attested from the 1970s
Languages of Pakistan
Dialects of English
Languages of the Pakistani diaspora